R-39UTTH Bark, NATO reporting name SS-NX-28, was a Russian submarine-launched ballistic missile. The missile was an upgraded version of the R-39 missile that was designed for the Typhoon class. The new missile was to be carried by the new Russian nuclear submarines of the Borei class. The third test launch of a prototype R-39M on 25 November 1998 resulted in a catastrophic failure of the SLBM's booster. The missile exploded roughly 200 meters after take-off from its ground-based launch facility. Having failed its first three test firings the project was ordered abandoned by the Russian Security Council. The missile was later replaced by the Bulava and Layner missile systems.

See also
 R-39 Rif
 R-29 Vysota
 R-29RM Shtil
 R-29RMU Sineva
 R-29RMU2 Layner
 RSM-56 Bulava
 UGM-133 Trident II
 M45 (missile)
 M51 (missile)
 JL-1
 JL-2
 Pukkuksong-1

References

External links 
 FAS.org-R39M
 Баллистическая ракета подводных лодок Р-39 (РСМ-52) | Военный портал

Submarine-launched ballistic missiles of Russia
Makeyev Rocket Design Bureau